Huw Alexander Evans (born 9 August 2000) is a Welsh/English cricketer. He made his first-class debut on 26 March 2019, for Loughborough MCCU in the 2019 Marylebone Cricket Club University Matches. In December 2019, he signed a professional deal with Leicestershire County Cricket Club.

References

External links
 

2000 births
English cricketers
English cricketers of the 21st century
Leicestershire cricketers
Living people
Loughborough MCCU cricketers
Sportspeople from Bedford
Bedfordshire cricketers